Acacia clandullensis, commonly known as gold dust wattle, is a shrub belonging to the genus Acacia and the subgenus Phyllodineae. It is endemic to New South Wales.

Description
It has slightly ridged densely hairy branchlets that become terete. Like most species of Acacia it has phyllodes rather than true leaves. The light gren phyllodes are sparsely hairy when young and have a subprominent midvein.

Taxonomy
The species was first formally described by the botanists Barry Conn and Terry Tame in 1996 as part of the work A revision of the Acacia uncinata group (Fabaceae-Mimosoideae) as published in Australian Systematic Botany. It was reclassified as Racosperma clandullense in 2003 by Leslie Pedley then transferred back to genus Acacia in 2006. It is quite similar in appearance to Acacia sertiformis.

Distribution
It is mostly found in the areas around Clandulla and Glen Davis growing at higher altitudes in stony sandy or clay-loam soils where it is usually part of open Eucalyptus rossii woodland communities.

See also
List of Acacia species

References

External links
Acacia clandullensis occurrence data from Australasian Virtual Herbarium

clandullensis
Flora of New South Wales
Plants described in 1996
Taxa named by Barry John Conn